Angela Beth Woznuk Kerr (born March 29, 1985) is an American former soccer midfielder who played professionally through October 21, 2014.  Her career culminated with  Portland Thorns FC of the National Women's Soccer League and she played as a member of the United States women's national soccer team in 2005, 2008, and 2009.

Playing career 
Kerr's national participation began with the United States U-19 team, with whom she traveled to Thailand for the 2004 FIFA U-19 Women's World Championship, winning the tournament's Silver Ball and Bronze Shoe (with three goals).  She would go on to join the women's national team in 2005, earning her tenth and final cap on the team's 2009 trip to Portugal for the Algarve Cup.

Meanwhile, her collegiate career would reach a high note as she was a standout player for the Portland Pilots as they won the NCAA title in 2005, helped by her goal and two assists in the final championship.  In a total of 88 appearances for the Pilots, Kerr notched a total of 19 goals and 34 assists.

Angie began her Women's Professional Soccer (WPS) career when she was drafted 15th overall by the Saint Louis Athletica in the 2008 Women's Professional Soccer General Draft, making 18 appearances in her rookie season with team.  On February 2, 2010, she was traded along with Kia McNeill and the rights to third round draft choice Amanda Poach, to the Atlanta Beat in exchange for the 1st pick in the Los Angeles Sol dispersal draft.  She played in more than 20 games for the Beat and scored the only league goal of her career during her single season in Atlanta.  She proceeded to play her third professional season with Sky Blue FC, though in a more limited capacity.

With the demise of WPS, it was not until the founding of the National Women's Soccer League (NWSL) that Kerr again had the opportunity to play professionally.  The Portland Thorns FC selected her as the 16th overall pick of the 2013 National Women's Soccer League Supplemental Draft, giving her the chance to return to Portland as a hometown hero.  She was waived by the Portland Thorns FC in September 2014.  A consistent part of the Thorns first two seasons, during which she notched four assists in close to thirty appearances, she announced her retirement from playing professionally in October 2014.

International goals

References

External links
 
 US Soccer player profile
 Saint Louis Athletica player profile
 Portland player profile

Living people
Saint Louis Athletica players
Atlanta Beat (WPS) players
NJ/NY Gotham FC players
1985 births
Portland Pilots women's soccer players
American women's soccer players
Portland Thorns FC players
United States women's international soccer players
Soccer players from California
National Women's Soccer League players
Women's association football midfielders
Women's Professional Soccer players